The Skanderbeg Monument is a monument in the Skanderbeg Square in Tirana, Albania. It commemorates Skanderbeg (1405–1468), the national hero in Albania for resisting the Ottomans.

Created by Odhise Paskali, the  monument was inaugurated in 1968 on the 500th anniversary of the death of Skanderbeg.

Gallery

See also
 Skanderbeg Square
 Tirana
 Architecture of Albania

References

External links
Photos of Skanderbeg Square
Sheshi Skenderbej and other photos

Outdoor sculptures in Tirana
Buildings and structures completed in 1968
Monuments and memorials in Albania
National symbols of Albania
1968 establishments in Albania
Cultural depictions of Skanderbeg
Statues of military officers